Entede Bhanta is a 1992 Indian Kannada-language action drama film directed by D. Rajendra Babu and produced by H. N. Maruthi. Based on a novel by Sudarshan Desai, the film featured Ambareesh, Rajani and Vanitha Vasu.  The film's music was composed by Hamsalekha and cinematography was by H. G. Raju.

Cast 
 Ambareesh as Bheema
 Rajani as Saraswati
 Vanitha Vasu as Ganga
 Sathyapriya
 Vajramuni
 Girija Lokesh
 Lakshman
 Kashi
 Sadashiva Brahmavar
 Ashalatha
 Krishne Gowda
 Richard Louis

Soundtrack 
The music of the film was composed and lyrics were written by Hamsalekha. Audio was released on Lahari Music label.

References 

1992 films
1990s action drama films
1990s Kannada-language films
Indian action drama films
Films based on Indian novels
Films scored by Hamsalekha
Films directed by D. Rajendra Babu
1992 drama films